Mr. Johnson (born 1966) is a Nigerian musician.

Mr. Johnson may also refer to:
Mr. Johnson (Sesame Street), a character on Sesame Street

See also
Mister Johnson (disambiguation page)
List of people with surname Johnson